Corey Michael Linsley (born July 27, 1991) is an American football center for the Los Angeles Chargers of the National Football League (NFL). He played college football at Ohio State. Linsley was drafted by the Green Bay Packers in the fifth round of the 2014 NFL Draft.

High school career
A native of Boardman, Ohio, Linsley attended Boardman High School, where he earned first-team All-Federal League, All-Northeast Ohio and second-team All-Ohio honors. He served as a team captain as a senior. He was named to SuperPrep's Midwest Top 30.

As a standout athlete, he lettered all four years in track & field, where he was the regional and league champion and a state medalist in the shot put (top throw of 19.24 meters as a senior). He also threw the discus, with a top throw of 58.27 meters as a senior. At Ohio State, he considered switching to track and field and quit football entirely.

Regarded as a four-star recruit by Rivals.com, Linsley was listed as the No. 6 offensive guard prospect of his class.

College career

After redshirting his initial year at Ohio State, Linsley saw limited action in six games in 2010, mostly as a reserve right guard or tackle. As a sophomore, he appeared in ten games, still as a reserve. He did see significant action on the PAT and field goal teams as a blocker, though.

After playing two seasons at guard, he was designated to succeed All-American center Mike Brewster at center. He started all 12 games at center and help the Buckeyes to post a Big Ten-best 37.2 points per game while ranking second in rushing with an average of 242.2 yards per game on the ground.

Linsley was viewed as an integral part of the Buckeyes' offense.

Professional career

Green Bay Packers 
Linsley was selected in the fifth round (161st overall) by the Green Bay Packers in the 2014 NFL Draft. On May 15, 2014, he signed a contract with the Packers.

In 2014, Linsley was initially supposed to be the Packers' back-up center, but an injury to expected starter J. C. Tretter late in the preseason made Linsley the surprise starting center for the regular season. After Tretter came back from his injury, Linsley remained as starting center and ended up starting every game during the regular season as well as the 2 playoff games.

On September 3, 2016, Linsley was placed on Reserve/PUP to start the season after a lingering hamstring injury. He was activated off PUP on November 5, 2016.

On December 30, 2017, Linsley signed a three-year, $25.5 million contract extension with the Packers after starting all 16 games at center in 2017.

On December 5, 2020, Linsley was placed on injured reserve after suffering a knee injury in Week 12. On December 26, 2020, Linsley was activated off of injured reserve.

Los Angeles Chargers
On March 17, 2021, Linsley signed a five-year, $62.5 million contract with the Los Angeles Chargers, making him the highest-paid center in the league.

Personal life
Linsley is married to Anna Linsley. They have two sons together.

References

External links

Ohio State Buckeyes bio

1991 births
Living people
People from Boardman, Ohio
Players of American football from Youngstown, Ohio
American football centers
American football offensive guards
American football offensive tackles
Ohio State Buckeyes football players
Green Bay Packers players
Los Angeles Chargers players
American Conference Pro Bowl players